Men's 12.5 km biathlon events at the 2006 Winter Paralympics were contested at Pragelato on 11 March.

There were 3 events. Standings were decided by applying a disability factor to the actual times achieved, and for each missed shot a penalty of one minute was added to the calculated time.

Visually impaired

The visually impaired event was won by Vitaliy Lukyanenko, representing .

Sitting

The sitting event was won by Vladimir Kiselev, representing .

Standing

The standing event was won by Rustam Garifoullin, representing .

References

M